The Fan is a river in northern Albania. It is formed by the confluence of two source rivers: the Great Fan and the Little Fan, that join a few kilometers west of the town Rrëshen.

The Great Fan rises near the village Kryezi, Qafë-Mali municipal unit, in the Shkodër County. It flows generally southwest through Fushë-Arrëz and Gjegjan. The Little Fan rises near the village Thirrë, in the municipal unit Fan, Mirditë municipality, Lezhë County. It flows southwest through Reps (Orosh) and just north of Rrëshen. West of Rrëshen the two source rivers unite and the Fan continues west to Rubik, and then south until its outflow into the river Mat, east of Milot.

Gallery

Rivers of Albania
Geography of Shkodër County
Geography of Lezhë County
Braided rivers in Albania